Governor Wicklife may refer to:

Charles A. Wickliffe, Acting Governor of Kentucky from 1839 to 1840
Robert C. Wickliffe, 15th Governor of Louisiana